Richard Ackerschott (10 December 1921 – 31 March 2002) was a German footballer who played as a defender for Werder Bremen. He made about 800 appearances for the club.

References

External links
 

1921 births
2002 deaths
German footballers
Association football defenders
SV Werder Bremen players
Sportspeople from Wuppertal
Footballers from North Rhine-Westphalia